Mariya Penrivna Litoshenko (born September 24, 1949) is a former Soviet/Ukrainian handball player who competed in the 1976 Summer Olympics. She was born in Kyiv.

In 1976 she won the gold medal with the Soviet team. She played all five matches and scored six goals.

External links
profile

1949 births
Living people
Sportspeople from Kyiv
Soviet female handball players
Ukrainian female handball players
Handball players at the 1980 Summer Olympics
Olympic handball players of the Soviet Union
Olympic gold medalists for the Soviet Union
Olympic medalists in handball
Medalists at the 1976 Summer Olympics
Honoured Masters of Sport of the USSR